Catabola is a town and municipality in Bié Province in central Angola. The municipality had a population of 126,631 in 2014.

History
Before 1975 the main town was known as "Nova Sintra". It was captured along with towns such as Andulo, Bailundo, Camapuca and Chiguar during the FAA Christmas Offensive of December 1999. Numerous local government officials and sympathizers of the government were killed during the attack.

References

Populated places in Bié Province
Municipalities of Angola